UMS-Wright is an independent  co-educational preparatory school in Mobile, Alabama. The school was founded in 1893 as University Military School, and in 1988 it combined with Julius T Wright School for Girls (founded 1956) to form UMS-Wright Preparatory School.

History

University Military School 
UMS-Wright Preparatory opened as University Military School on October 2, 1893, at 559 Conti Street. The school's founder and first headmaster was Dr. Julius T. Wright (1871–1931). The school’s opening day coincided with the 1893 Cheniere Caminada hurricane. The school had a single teacher and twenty-five pupils at a tuition of $8 a month. Dr. Wright served as the headmaster of the school until his death in 1931. William Pape took over after Dr. Wright. Pape died in 1943 and his family turned control of the school over to a nonprofit corporation, the UMS Alumni and Parents Association, Inc. UMS moved the school to its current location on North Mobile Street in 1956 to accommodate the growing number of students.

Girls Preparatory School 
Thirty years after the opening of University Military School (an all male school) Julius T Wright opened Girls Preparatory School in 1923 to provide a similar education to the young women of the Mobile community. It only lasted eight years as it closed after the death of Dr. Wright in 1931.

Julius T. Wright School for Girls 
Julius T. Wright School for Girls opened in 1956 at the same location as Girls Preparatory School at 1315 Dauphin Street, which had been newly renovated. It came after a long campaign by alumni of the original Girls Preparatory School to have a female equivalent to University Military School.  The school moved to 1400 S University Blvd in 1972. It remained there until its merger with University Military School in 1988.

UMS-Wright Preparatory School 
In 1988, University Military School and Julius T Wright School for Girls followed the trend of many other single-gender schools around the country and combined to form the co-educational UMS-Wright Preparatory School. Dr. Tony Havard, a member of the UMS English faculty, was named the headmaster and is now the current president of the school.

Description

Structure 
The school has a three-level structure: the Lower School (K-3 through 4th grade), the Middle school (5th grade through 8th grade), and the Upper School (9th grade through 12th grade).

Campus 
Located on Campus are five Lower School buildings, two middle school buildings, and one high school building. All three have separate offices and principals. The campus also houses two full-size gymnasiums, a weight training facility, and an athletic training facility. The football stadium, Cooper Stadium, is surrounded by a four-hundred meter track. Also located on Campus are two multi-purpose fields, a twenty-five-meter swimming pool, a baseball field, and a softball field.

Athletics 
UMS-Wright offers thirteen team sports for students from lower school to high school. The school competes in the AHSAA division 4A. The Sports offered include cross country, football, soccer, tennis, swimming and diving, track and field, softball, baseball, bass fishing, and bowling.

UMS-Wright also has a long-standing athletic rivalry with St. Paul's Episcopal School, another local private high school that is just 2.2 miles away down Old Shell Road. In football and track and field, the two teams meet every year in the "Battle of Old Shell Road."

State titles 
UMS-Wright has 156 total state championship titles: 

 Baseball ~ 1978 • 1988 • 1993 • 1995  • 1997 • 1999 •  2010 • 2011 • 2016 • 2017
 Boys Basketball ~ 1998
 Girls Basketball ~ 1978
 Boys Cross Country ~ 1971 • 1975 • 1980 • 1997 • 2008 • 2009 • 2010 • 2011 
 Girls Cross Country ~ 1977 • 1980 • 1981 • 1982 • 1983 • 2004 • 2005 • 2009 • 2010 • 2011 • 2012 • 2013
Football ~ 1987 • 2001 • 2002 • 2005 • 2008 • 2012 • 2017 • 2018 • 2019
 Boys Soccer ~ 2010 • 2011
 Swimming and Diving ~ 1997 • 2018
 Boys Tennis  1968 • 1981 • 1989 • 1990 • 2001 • 2002 • 2003 • 2004 • 2006 • 2009 • 2010 • 2011 • 2012 • 2013 • 2014 • 2015 • 2016
 Girls Tennis 1978 • 1994 • 2004 • 2005 • 2006 • 2009 • 2010 • 2011 • 2012 • 2013 • 2014 • 2015 • 2016 • 2017 • 2018
Boys Outdoor Track ~  1981 • 1982 • 1983 • 1990 • 1991 • 1997 • 1988 • 1999 • 2000 • 2002 • 2003 • 2004 • 2005 • 2006 • 2009 • 2010 • 2011 • 2012 • 2013 • 2014 • 2015 • 2016
 Girls Outdoor Track ~ 1982 • 1983 • 2000 • 2001 • 2002 • 2003 • 2004 • 2005 • 2006 • 2009 • 2010 • 2011 • 2012 • 2013 • 2015 • 2016 • 2018
 Boys Indoor Track ~ 1972  • 1981 • 1982 • 1983 • 1985 • 1997 • 1998 • 1999 • 2000 • 2006 • 2012 • 2013 • 2014 • 2015
 Girls Indoor Track ~ 1981 • 1982 • 1984 • 1997 • 2001 • 2012 • 2013
 Junior High Indoor Track ~ 1968
 Boys Golf ~ 1961 • 1971 • 1980 • 1983 • 1990 • 1992 • 1993 • 1994 • 1995 • 1996 • 1997 • 1998 • 1999 • 2000 • 2001 • 2002 • 2003 • 2008 • 2009 • 2010 • 2011 • 2014 • 2016 • 2017

Academics

UMS Wright was ranked second out of ninety-seven schools in Niche.com "Best Private K-12 Schools in Alabama" ranking. The average ACT score is 30 and the average SAT score in 1360. 99% of graduating seniors attend a four-year college or university, with the 3 most popular being the University of Alabama, Auburn University, and the University of South Alabama. The school currently has 1,150 students enrolled with a student-teacher ratio of 8:1.

Clubs 
 Art Guild
 Azalea Trail
 French Club
 Spanish Circle
 Theatre Guild
 Wright Singers
 Youth Judicial

Honor Societies 
Cum Laude Society
National Honor Society
Quill & Scroll
Mu Alpha Theta
Science National Honor Society
 Spanish/French Honor Society
 National English Honor Society
 Rho Kappa Honor Society

Honor Council 
The Honor Council is composed of student representatives in grades 9–12 who are elected to promote honesty and integrity.

Notable alumni 
 Miller Reese Hutchison (around 1895; there are very few records of the early UMS graduates); inventor of the vehicle horn and hearing aid
Winston Groom (1961), Author of Forrest Gump
 Bradley Byrne (1973), former U.S. Representative.
Jay Prosch (2009), Professional American football player
Sandy Stimpson (1970), Mayor of Mobile, Alabama
Bobby Wyatt (2010), Professional golfer

References

External links 
 https://www.ums-wright.org

Schools accredited by the Southern Association of Colleges and Schools
Schools in Mobile, Alabama
Preparatory schools in Alabama
Educational institutions established in 1893
1893 establishments in Alabama